Muddy Creek is a stream in Johnson and Pettis Counties in the U.S. state of Missouri. It is a tributary of Lamine River.

The stream flows northeast and enters Pettis County about three miles southeast of Whiteman Air Force Base. The stream continues to the northeast passing under Missouri Route 127 three miles south of LaMonte and under U.S. Route 50 three miles west of Sedalia. It crosses under U.S. Route 65 six miles north of Sedalia.

Muddy Creek was so named on account of its muddy water.

See also
List of rivers of Missouri

References

Rivers of Johnson County, Missouri
Rivers of Pettis County, Missouri
Rivers of Missouri